Richard Tremain (1774-1854) was an influential militia officer and merchant in Nova Scotia.  He participated in a pressgang riot during the War of 1812 against the Royal Navy. He was an opponent of Joseph Howe.

References 

History of Nova Scotia
1774 births
1854 deaths